The 1951 European Figure Skating Championships were held in Zürich, Switzerland from February 2 to 4. Elite senior-level figure skaters from European ISU member nations competed for the title of European Champion in the disciplines of men's singles, ladies' singles, and pair skating.

Results

Men

Ladies

Pairs

References

External links
 results

European Figure Skating Championships, 1951
European Figure Skating Championships, 1951
European Figure Skating Championships
International figure skating competitions hosted by Switzerland
Sports competitions in Zürich
20th century in Zürich
European Figure Skating Championships